Tapinanthus is a genus of mistletoe in the family Loranthaceae, endemic to Africa. The name of the genus is derived from the Greek tapeinos meaning "low" or "humble" and anthos meaning flower.

Species
It may contain some 40 species, with 30 being accepted:
 Tapinanthus apodanthus (Sprague) Danser
 Tapinanthus bangwensis (Engl. & K.Krause) Danser
 Tapinanthus belvisii (DC.) Danser
 Tapinanthus buchneri (Engl.) Danser
 Tapinanthus buntingii (Sprague) Danser
 Tapinanthus buvumae (Rendle) Danser
 Tapinanthus constrictiflorus (Engl.) Danser
 Tapinanthus cordifolius Polhill & Wiens
 Tapinanthus coronatus (Tiegh.) Danser
 Tapinanthus dependens (Engl.) Danser
 Tapinanthus erectotruncatus Balle ex Polhill & Wiens
 Tapinanthus erianthus (Sprague) Danser
 Tapinanthus farmari (Sprague) Danser
 Tapinanthus forbesii (Sprague) Wiens
 Tapinanthus glaucophyllus (Engl.) Danser
 Tapinanthus globiferus (A.Rich.) Tiegh.
 Tapinanthus letouzeyi (Balle) Polhill & Wiens
 Tapinanthus longiflorus Polhill & Wiens
 Tapinanthus malacophyllus (Engl. & K.Krause) Danser
 Tapinanthus mechowii (Engl.) Tiegh.
 Tapinanthus mollissimus (Engl.) Danser
 Tapinanthus ogowensis (Engl.) Danser
 Tapinanthus oleifolius (J.C.Wendl.) Danser
 Tapinanthus ophiodes (Sprague) Danser
 Tapinanthus pentagonia (DC.) Tiegh.
 Tapinanthus praetexta Polhill & Wiens
 Tapinanthus preussii (Engl.) Tiegh.
 Tapinanthus quequensis (Weim.) Polhill & Wiens
 Tapinanthus rubromarginatus (Engl.) Danser
 Tapinanthus sessilifolius (P.Beauv.) Blume

References

 
Loranthaceae genera
Flora of Africa
Taxonomy articles created by Polbot